The Chambly Forts are a Canadian Junior ice hockey team from Chambly, Quebec, Canada.  They are part of the Quebec Junior AAA Hockey League. Home games are played at Centre Sportif Robert-Lebel.

On April 29, 2015, a consortium purchased the Kahnawake Condors and transferred the franchise to Chambly for the 2015-2016 season.  At the time of relocation the franchise had not yet claimed a regular season division nor league title and had failed to advance beyond the quarterfinal round in playoff competition.

After the first 3 seasons as the Forts their final standings in regular season and playoff rounds had improved to quarter final in 2017-18 season.

Season-by-season record
Season-by-season results for the team are shown below.

Note: GP = Games Played, W = Wins, L = Losses, T = Ties, OTL = Overtime Losses, GF = Goals for, GA = Goals against

References

External links
Chambly Forts Webpage

Ligue de Hockey Junior AAA Quebec teams
1999 establishments in Quebec
Ice hockey teams in Quebec
Chambly, Quebec